Artyom Gennadyevich Rebrov (born 4 March 1984) is a Russian former football goalkeeper who works as a technical coordinator at Spartak Moscow.

Club career
He made his Russian Premier League debut for FC Tom Tomsk on 27 September 2008 in a game against PFC CSKA Moscow.

He gained national prominence after moving to Spartak Moscow, for which he played between 2011 and 2021. He was the first-choice goalkeeper for different periods during the decade, including in years Spartak participated in the UEFA Champions League. He was also the team's Vice Captain.

In 2021, he retired to focus on his new role of technical coordinator, focusing on communications between Spartak's coaching staff (of which he is a key member) and the club administration.

Career statistics

Notes

Club honours

Spartak Moscow

Russian Premier League: 2016–17
Russian Super Cup: 2017

References

External links
 
 
  Player page on the official FC Tom Tomsk website
 

1984 births
Footballers from Moscow
Living people
Russian footballers
Russia under-21 international footballers
Russia international footballers
FC Tom Tomsk players
FC Saturn Ramenskoye players
Russian Premier League players
Association football goalkeepers
FC Dynamo Moscow players
FC Shinnik Yaroslavl players
FC Spartak Moscow players
FC Avangard Kursk players